Operation Information was a DuMont Television Network public affairs TV show giving veterans information on their rights and benefits. The show aired Thursdays from July 17, 1952 to September 18, 1952. DuMont had previously aired a similar series for veterans Operation Success (1948–49).

Episode status
As with many DuMont series, no episodes are known to exist.

See also
List of programs broadcast by the DuMont Television Network
List of surviving DuMont Television Network broadcasts

References

Bibliography
David Weinstein, The Forgotten Network: DuMont and the Birth of American Television (Philadelphia: Temple University Press, 2004) 
Alex McNeil, Total Television, Fourth edition (New York: Penguin Books, 1980) 
Tim Brooks and Earle Marsh, The Complete Directory to Prime Time Network TV Shows, Third edition (New York: Ballantine Books, 1964)

External links
Operation Information at IMDB
CTVA entry
DuMont historical website

DuMont Television Network original programming
1952 American television series debuts
1952 American television series endings
Black-and-white American television shows
Lost television shows
DuMont news programming